Experimental Aging Research is a peer-reviewed scientific journal covering research  on life span and aging from a psychological and psychobiological perspective. It is published by Routledge. The editor-in-chief is Philip A. Allen.

Abstracting and indexing 
The journal is abstracted and indexed in Biological Abstracts, BIOSIS Previews, EBSCO Academic Search Premier, CINAHL/Cumulative Index to Nursing and Allied Health Literature, Current Contents/Life Sciences, Science Citation Index Expanded, MEDLINE/Index Medicus, PsycINFO, and Scopus. According to the Journal Citation Reports, the journal has a 2011 impact factor of 1.306.

References

External links 
 

English-language journals
Gerontology journals
Taylor & Francis academic journals
Publications established in 1975
Quarterly journals